Hazel Erskine (née McGregor) is a Scottish curler.

At the national level, she is a 1983 Scottish women's champion curler.

Teams

References

External links

Living people
Scottish female curlers
Scottish curling champions
Sportspeople from Perth, Scotland
Year of birth missing (living people)
Place of birth missing (living people)